Radion may refer to:

Radion (physics), a scalar field in quantum field theory in spacetimes with additional dimensions
 A nightclub in Amsterdam RADION.amsterdam
A DC comics villain or toxic substance (see List of DC Comics metahumans and List of objects in the DC Universe)
RADION International
Radion (given name)